Susana Chávez Castillo (November 5, 1974 – c. January 6, 2011) was a Mexican poet and human rights activist who was born and lived most of her life in her hometown of Ciudad Juárez.

She is credited with authorship of the phrase "Not one more", which was used by the civil rights organizations and their supporters struggling to clarify the plight of women in Juárez and to end a wave of killings aimed specifically at women since 1993. 

She was found murdered and mutilated in the "Colonia Cuauhtémoc" section of the city of Juárez where she was born and lived most of her life. Positive identification of the remains took place on January 11 of 2011. She was 36 years old.

Life and work
Susana Chávez began her foray into the poetry scene when she was age eleven. She consistently participated in various literary festivals both in Ciudad Juárez and in other cultural forums throughout Mexico. According to Chávez's blog profile, she received a degree in psychology from the Universidad Autónoma de Ciudad Juárez (UACJ) and was working on a book of poems.

Death
Chávez was strangled in her hometown of Ciudad Juárez, most likely on January 6, 2011. According to a statement released by Chávez's mother, her daughter was going to visit some friends but did not reach her destination. On the morning of January 6, 2011 her body and severed hand were found. Her head was covered with a black bag. On January 10, Chávez's family identified the body, but this information was not released until the next day after it was announced that three individuals were detained for their alleged involvement in the murder.

The state attorney general of Chihuahua, Carlos Manuel Salas, said that the murder of Chávez was not related to her role as an activist. According to Salas, Chávez had inadvertently met up with a group of youths who had gone out "to have fun", and this involved drugs and alcohol.

Human Rights organizations argued that he (Salas) wanted to blame the victim (Chavez) for her own murder. Norma Ledezma, organization coordinator for Justice for our Daughters, said that the death of Susana Chavez is part of the attitude of exemption that lives in Juarez. On the same note, the founder of the organization May Our Daughters Return Home, Marisela Ortiz denounced the culture of intolerance and impunity as perpetuating the idea that anyone can commit a crime. International amnesty then demanded swift, apparent action be taken.

Gustavo de la Rosa, an official from the State Human Rights Commission of Chihuahua, showed his concern for the recent events by emphasizing that the majority of people in Juarez think that there is no delinquency, only organized crime. Nevertheless, he maintains his stance that he, along with others, are living in a state of criminal anarchy in which the “lumpen” (urban social group) dominate the areas that the government cannot control. Incidentally the three detained minors belong to a socially marginalized group whom Susana was accustomed to working with in her humanitarian efforts.

 After the arrest of the young men, it became known that they were a part of the dangerous and very violent gang “Los Aztecas” and had been under the influence of drugs and alcohol. Their confession of membership in Los Aztecas had started an intense disagreement; Susana then threatened to turn them into the police and they killed her.

In 2013 Susana’s three murderers were given the maximum penalty of fifteen years in prison by a specialized court for juvenile offenders.

Legacy
In the summer of 2016 a demonstration about women's rights took place in Peru called "NiUnaMenos" which ignited by the treatment of Cindy Arlette Contreras Bautista, but it was called "#NiUnaMenos" in reference to the life and death of Susana Chavez.

See also
  Female homicides in Ciudad Juárez
 Marisela Escobedo Ortiz 
 Chihuahuan

References

External links
 
 Susana Chávez profile

1974 births
2011 deaths\
20th-century Mexican poets
20th-century Mexican women writers
Mexican human rights activists
Women human rights activists
People murdered in Mexico
Violence against women in Mexico
Mexican women poets
National Autonomous University of Mexico alumni
Mexican murder victims
Deaths by strangulation
People from Ciudad Juárez
Incidents of violence against women